Admiral Sir Israel Pellew, KCB, RN (25 August 1758 – 19 July 1832), was an English naval officer who spent his career under the shadow of his more successful older brother Edward Pellew.

Early naval service
Pellew first went to sea aboard the sloop  in 1771, serving in the West Indies. He went to the North American station on the frigate HMS Flora in 1776. He was placed in command of the cutter  in the North Sea in 1782. In 1783 he captured the Dutch privateer Flushinger in a single-ship action. Resolution transferred to the Irish station, with Pellew remaining in command until 1787. In March 1789 he joined , and was promoted to commander in 1790, but was not employed again during the peace.

In April 1795, he was made captain of a larger frigate, commanding her off Newfoundland and in the North Sea. In September 1796, sailing to join his brother's squadron in the Channel, Pellew took Amphion into Plymouth for repairs. On 22 September she suddenly exploded alongside the dock. About 300 of her crew and visitors were killed. Pellew survived, being blown through an open stern gallery window on to the deck of a sheer hulk. An inquiry blamed the explosion on the Amphion's gunner, who was suspected of stealing gunpowder which caught fire and blew up the fore magazine. However, Pellew had already complained that the magazine was poorly constructed and unsafe, and questioned the judgement on the deceased gunner.

He commanded her first in the Channel, until November 1798, and then on the Halifax and Jamaica stations.

In 1800, Pellew suffered a setback when a boat attack to seize some Spanish vessels from an anchorage off Cuba was driven off with significant casualties and only the capture of a small galley. Later Cleopatra ran aground off Abaco, one of the Bahamas. She was aground for three days and only floated off after her guns and some ballast had been thrown overboard.

The Trafalgar Campaign
Pellew next went to sea in April 1804 following the Peace of Amiens, commanding the ship of the line  in the Channel before going to the Mediterranean in September and participating in the full chase across the Atlantic after the French fleet and the return leg to Cadiz. During this time, Pellew became good friends with his admiral and joined the famous Band of Brothers with which Nelson surrounded himself. The Conqueror fought well at the Battle of Trafalgar, being the fourth ship in the van or weather column under Nelson's command. The , Villeneuve's flagship, surrendered to Conqueror's captain of Marines, who had been sent aboard by Pellew to receive Villeneuve's sword. During the course of these later actions, Pellew was wounded by a close miss from a cannonball, but refused to report it or have it treated until well after the battle.

The French admiral's sword was eventually given to Admiral Collingwood after the battle and he retained it much to Pellew's disgust. Pellew was also greatly irked following the battle by the shadow of his brother, which appeared when the boarding party arrived on the deck of the Bucentaure. Marine captain James Atcherly boarded the ship and encountered Admiral Villeneuve, who asked for the identity of his captor. Atcherly replied that it was Captain Pellew, whereupon Villeneuve pronounced "It is a satisfaction to me that it is to so fortunate an officer as Sir Edward Pellew that I have surrendered". The greatly embarrassed Atcherly corrected his mistake, to which Villeneuve shouted "His brother? What are there two of them? Helas!"

Although the Conqueror's sails and rigging suffered considerable damage, she suffered only three dead and nine wounded despite being in the thick of battle, and returned to Gibraltar largely unharmed by the large storm which followed the action, and was even able to help some more crippled ships back to port. After Trafalgar the Conqueror helped continue to blockade Cádiz and then, in 1807, was in the squadron sent to secure the Portuguese fleet and royal family. She remained off the Portuguese coast during much of 1808, eventually returning home after the surrender of Siniavin's Russian squadron in the Tagus. Pellew then left her and was appointed to superintend the payment of ships in the Medway.

Admiral Pellew and retirement
In 1810, Pellew was promoted to rear-admiral and, in 1816, his brother, on receiving the command of the Mediterranean fleet, made him captain of the fleet, effectively his chief of staff. In 1815, Pellew was knighted. He retained the position of captain of the fleet until 1816, taking a prominent part in the negotiations with the Barbary powers that year and the ensuing bombardment of Algiers. This marked the end of his active service, but Pellew advanced automatically to the rank of vice-admiral in 1819.

In the same year his only son, Edward, an officer in the Life Guards, was killed in a duel with a brother officer in Paris. Pellew was appointed a full admiral in 1830. He had moved to Plymouth in retirement and died there in 1832, after a long and painful illness.

Pellew was buried near his home in Plymouth at Charles the Martyr Church, but on 21 March 1941 a massive German air raid in the Blitz demolished the church and its attendant graveyard. The ruins of the church remain standing as a memorial to that night, but there is no surviving indication of the whereabouts of Pellew's body or tomb, which is believed to have been lost.

References

Further reading 
The Trafalgar Captains, Colin White and the 1805 Club, Chatham Publishing, London, 2005,

External links 
Animation of the Battle of Trafalgar

1758 births
1832 deaths
Royal Navy admirals
Knights Commander of the Order of the Bath
Royal Navy personnel of the French Revolutionary Wars
Royal Navy personnel of the Napoleonic Wars
Royal Navy captains at the Battle of Trafalgar
Royal Navy personnel of the Bombardment of Algiers (1816)
Military personnel from Plymouth, Devon